Aleksei Ilyich Belenkov (born 26 March 1957) is a Russian professional football coach and former player. He works as an assistant manager with FC Tom Tomsk.

Honours
 Soviet Top League champion: 1976 (autumn).
 Soviet Top League bronze: 1977.

External links
  Career profile at Footballfacts

1957 births
People from Balashikha
Living people
Soviet footballers
Soviet Top League players
FC Torpedo Moscow players
PFC CSKA Moscow players
FC Lokomotiv Moscow players
Russian football managers
FC Pele Moscow managers
FC Torpedo-MKB Mytishchi managers
FC Titan Reutov managers
FC Shinnik Yaroslavl managers
FC Saturn Ramenskoye managers
FC Sokol Saratov managers
FC Khimki managers
FC Shakhter Karagandy managers
PFC CSKA Moscow managers
FC Spartak Vladikavkaz managers
FC Torpedo-ZIL Moscow managers
FC Ufa managers
Association football forwards
Sportspeople from Moscow Oblast